Train is a surname. Notable people with the surname include:

Charles J. Train (1845–1906), American naval officer
Charles R. Train (1817–1885), American politician
Charles R. Train (admiral) (1879–1967), American naval officer
Charles William Train (1890–1965), British soldier, recipient of the Victoria Cross
, French aviation pioneer. 
George Francis Train (1829–1904), American businessman, author and eccentric
Jack Train (1902–1966), British radio and film actor
John Train (investment advisor) (1928–2022), American investment advisor and author
John Train (politician) (1873–1942), Unionist Party (Scotland) MP for Glasgow Cathcart
John Butler Train, alter ego of American musician Phil Ochs
Joseph Train (1779–1852), Scottish antiquarian
Winnifred Train (1904–1979), New Zealand army nurse, hospital matron, nurses' association leader